Aaron Lustig (born September 17, 1956) is an American film and television actor. He was nominated for an Emmy Award in 1997, for Best Supporting Actor on The Young and the Restless as Tim Reid, whom he has also portrayed on The Bold and the Beautiful. He guest-starred in Criminal Minds as Walter Kern, a serial killer who has been inactive for eighteen years, in the episode "Unfinished Business". He made guest appearances in the seventh season of Desperate Housewives as a transplant coordinator working on the case of Susan Delfino (Teri Hatcher).

Lustig currently resides in Sherman Oaks, California.

Selected filmography 

 Lily in Love (1984) - Chauffeur
 Leap of Faith (1989, TV Movie) - Dr. Kent
 Naked Lie (1989, TV Movie) - Ellis Scott
 Ghostbusters II (1989) - Norman the Producer
 The Operation (1990, TV Movie) - Anesthesiologist
 Summer Dreams: The Story of the Beach Boys (1990, TV Movie) - Reporter at Beach
 Darkman (1990) - Martin Katz
 Edward Scissorhands (1990) - Psychologist
 Family of Spies (1990, TV Mini-Series) - FBI Agent #1
 Blind Faith (1990, TV Mini-Series) - Medical Examiner
 L.A. Story (1991) - Boring Speaker
 Roadside Prophets (1992) - Morning Desk Clerk
 Bad Channels (1992) - Vernon Locknut
 The Opposite Sex and How to Live with Them (1993) - Movie Bully
 Empty Cradle (1993, TV Movie) - Frazier Lawyer
 The Day My Parents Ran Away (1993, TV Movie) - Teacher Haldeman
 I'll Do Anything (1994) - Jack
 Monkey Trouble (1994) - Store Manager
 Ray Alexander: A Taste for Justice (1994, TV Movie) - Douglas Hirschman
 No Dessert, Dad, till You Mow the Lawn (1994) - Doctor
 The Shadow (1994) - Doctor
 Clear and Present Danger (1994) - Dr. Polk
 Girth of a Nation (1994)
 Scanner Cop II (1995) - Dr. Gordon
 Boys on the Side (1995) - Judge
 Star Trek: Voyager (1995, Episode: "Ex Post Facto") - Dr Tolen Ren
 Stuart Saves His Family (1995) - Fred
 A Mother's Prayer (1995, TV Movie) - Dr. Shapiro
 An Element of Truth (1995, TV Movie) - Cemetery Manager
 The Late Shift (1996, TV Movie) - Paul Shaffer
 If These Walls Could Talk (1996, TV Movie) - Tom (segment "1952")
 After Jimmy (1996, TV Movie) - Mike
 Pinocchio's Revenge (1996) - Dr. Edwards
 The Relic (1997) - Dr. Brown
 Murder in Mind (1997) - Defense Attorney
 Tuesdays with Morrie (1999, TV Movie) - Rabbi Al Axelrod (uncredited)
 Blood Type (1999) - Paul
 Gun Shy (2000) - Larry, Fulvio's Neighbor
 Bedazzled (2000) - Synedyne Supervisor
 Surviving Gilligan's Island (2001, TV Movie) - Sherwood Schwartz
 The Day After Tomorrow (2004) - Bernie
 Jane Doe: Vanishing Act (2005, TV Movie) - Miles Crandell
 Thank You for Smoking (2005) - Doctor
 Transformers: Revenge of the Fallen (2009) - Reporter #1
 Due Date (2010) - Dr. Greene
 The Rum Diary (2011) - Monk
 The Five-Year Engagement (2012) - Michigan Rabbi
 War Dogs (2016) - Rock Island Bureaucrat
 Blood Type (2018) - Paul

References

External links
 

1956 births
American male film actors
American male soap opera actors
American male television actors
Living people